Willie Simmons (born October 12, 1980) is the head coach of the Florida A&M Rattlers football team. Simmons was previously the head coach at Prairie View A&M from 2014 to 2017. He has also served as offensive coordinator of the Alcorn State Braves as well as the Middle Tennessee State Blue Raiders football teams. Simmons played college football at Clemson and The Citadel as a quarterback.

Early life 
Willie Román Simmons was born in Tallahassee, Florida, to Willie and Phyllis Simmons. He is the youngest of three children and the only son. He was an All-American quarterback (ranked #10 quarterback nationally) at James A. Shanks High School after leading the Tigers to their first district championship in 22 years and being named Big Bend Offensive Player of the Year after throwing for 2,505 yards and 32 touchdowns. He received over 25 scholarship offers, and after narrowing his college choices down to Florida State, Clemson, Georgia Tech, Syracuse, and Miami, he signed a National Letter of Intent to attend Clemson to play for former head coach Tommy Bowden. Simmons lettered three years at Clemson (2000–2002) and participated in four bowl games (Peach, Gator, Humanitarian, and Tangerine). Simmons earned his Bachelor of Science degree in services (sports) marketing from Clemson in the spring of 2002, just 3 years after he enrolled, which is the fastest any football player has ever graduated from the university. He initially transferred to Florida A&M University in Tallahassee, FL for his senior season, but after being deemed ineligible to compete because FAMU was in provisional status as a Division I-A (now FBS) program, he enrolled at The Citadel, where he garnered All Southern Conference First Team honors after leading the Bulldogs to a 6–6 record (their first non-losing season in 10 years). The Bulldogs also accomplished a feat that had only been done by Marshall, which was defeat Furman, Appalachian State, and Georgia Southern in the same season. After Simmons' college career, he played one season of arena football in the United Indoor Football League for the Sioux City Bandits, where he played alongside future NFL running back Fred Jackson.

Coaching career 
Willie Simmons began his coaching career in 2005 at Lincoln High School in Tallahassee, Florida, where he coached the quarterbacks and was also the Pass Game Coordinator. There he had the opportunity to coach former NFL and South Florida Bulls quarterback B.J. Daniels. After one season, he was brought back to his alma mater Clemson as a graduate assistant coach working with the quarterbacks.

Middle Tennessee State 

After one season at Clemson, Simmons was offered the position of running backs coach at Middle Tennessee State by head coach Rick Stockstill, who recruited Simmons to Clemson. Entering the 2010 season, after three seasons as the running backs coach, Simmons was promoted to Pass Game Coordinator. The following season, he was promoted to Offensive Coordinator. At the age of 30, he was one of the youngest coordinators at the FBS level. During his time as Offensive Coordinator, the Blue Raiders were ranked 20th nationally in Total Offense, while leading the Sun Belt Conference in total offense, rushing offense, and third-down conversion percentage, and ranking second in passing offense.

Alcorn State 

Simmons accepted a position on newly hired Jay Hopson's staff at Alcorn State in the summer of 2012. They inherited a program that had only won 2 games the previous season. Starting a true freshman quarterback and without spring practice, the Braves finished with a 4–7 record, highlighted by wins over previous Southwestern Athletic Conference (SWAC) champion Grambling State and #1 ranked Alabama A&M. The 2013 season saw the Braves and Simmons' offense finish 9–3 overall (7–2 in the SWAC) and ranked #5 in the final SBN Black College Football Poll (its highest ranking ever at the time). Simmons coached running back Arnold Walker to a career year as he led the conference in rushing (1,191 yards) and touchdowns (16), became the school's all-time leading rusher, and was voted SWAC Co-Offensive Player of the Year. Simmons' offense finished the season ranked in the Top 25 nationally in Total Offense, Rushing Offense, and Scoring Offense. 2014 was an even better year for Simmons and the Braves, as they won the Southwestern Athletic Conference Championship over Southern University, as well as being named Black College National Champions. The Braves offense set many records that season, as they finished second nationally in Scoring Offense, 8th in Total Offense, and 4th in Rushing Offense. Quarterback John Gibbs, Jr, was selected as SWAC Co-Offensive Player of the Year and Black College Player of the Year, giving Simmons two consecutive Player of the Year selections.

Prairie View A&M 

On December 16, 2014, Simmons was named the 32nd head football coach at Prairie View A&M University. The Panthers were picked to finish 3rd in the SWAC Western Division in the pre-season polls. Due to previous APR sanctions, the Panthers were not allowed to participate in spring practice. Despite this, Simmons' inaugural season saw Prairie View A&M finish with an 8–2 overall record (their win over the University of Faith was vacated by the NCAA because Faith did not meet accreditation requirements) and 8–1 conference record. The Panthers finished the season with the top Scoring Offense in the nation (44.9 points per game) and ranked 8th in Total Offense. They also finished the season ranked 3rd in the SBN Black College Football Poll. Simmons became the first first-year head football coach at Prairie View A&M since 1966 to have a winning record in his inaugural season, and the Panthers' 9 wins was tied for the most at Prairie View A&M since 1964. In 2016, Prairie View A&M finished with a 7-4 record and followed up with a 6–5 record in 2017. The 2017 season marked the 3rd consecutive winning season under Coach Simmons, only the second time in fifty years that the PVAMU Panthers had three consecutive winning seasons.

Florida A&M 

On December 12, 2017, Simmons was named the 18th head football coach at Florida A&M University. The storied Rattlers program had fallen on tough times, as it was fresh off a seven-year losing streak. In his first season at the helm, Simmons led FAMU to a second place finish in the Mid-Eastern Athletic Conference, finishing one win away from winning its first MEAC championship since 2011. The team's 6-5 overall record ended the losing streak, and their 22-21 come from behind victory on the road over the eventual conference and Black College National Champion North Carolina A&T was the highlight of the season. The 2019 season was Simmons’ best to date as the Rattlers finished the season with a 9-2 overall record (7-1 conference) and ranked #21 in the final FCS polls. Quarterback Ryan Stanley was named MEAC Offensive Player of the Year and rewrote the FAMU record books, leaving as the school’s all-time leader in passing yards, passing attempts, completions, and passing touchdowns. Due to a self imposed one year postseason ban, Florida A&M was not able to be named conference champions and was ineligible for the Air Force Reserves Celebration Bowl.

Florida A&M opted out of competition for the 2020 season due to COVID-19. They resumed the 2021 season as the newest member of the Southwestern Athletic Conference (SWAC) after 35+ years in the Mid-Eastern Athletic Conference (MEAC). That season saw FAMU finish with a 9-3 overall record (7-1 conference), ranked in the final FCS polls (#24) and the school's first FCS playoff appearance since 2001. Junior Edge Rusher Isaiah Land led the nation in sacks (19) and tackles for loss (25.5) and won the Buck Buchanan Award as the best defensive player in FCS. FAMU's defense finished the season ranked in the top 10 nationally in most statistical categories and four players earned All-American recognition, led by Land and All-American Safety Markquese Bell. Bell would later become the first FAMU football player in over 8 years to make an NFL roster (currently plays for the Dallas Cowboys). The 2022 season saw FAMU start the season 0-2, but then go on a 6 game winning streak. Willie earned his 50th career win as a head coach when the Rattlers defeated Grambling St. on October 15, 2022. The Rattlers currently have the nation's second longest home win streak at 14 games.

Personal life 
Simmons is married to the former Shaia René Beckwith (also a Quincy native) who is a two time graduate of Florida A&M University . They have six children (Louis III, Amerie, Raven, Shailoh, Wraylon, and Truth). Simmons' father was a well-respected mechanic in the small city of Quincy, Florida where they resided, until a work related accident took his life in 1987 when Willie was six years old. Simmons' mother was a staunch supporter of academic excellence and an accomplished math teacher in the Gadsden County School District for 28 years until chronic renal failure forced her to retire. Willie once earned a ‘C’ grade in middle school and his mother threatened to not let him touch a football again. She died in 2005.  He was given the nickname "Shotgun" by his high school game announcer for his strong arm and quick release.

Head coaching record

*Could not be named MEAC champions in 2019 due to NCAA sanctions.

References

External links
 Florida A&M profile
 Prairie View A&M profile
 

1980 births
Living people
American football quarterbacks
Alcorn State Braves football coaches
Clemson Tigers football players
Clemson Tigers football coaches
Florida A&M Rattlers football coaches
Middle Tennessee Blue Raiders football coaches
Prairie View A&M Panthers football coaches
Sioux City Bandits players
The Citadel Bulldogs football players
People from Quincy, Florida
Coaches of American football from Florida
Players of American football from Tallahassee, Florida
African-American coaches of American football
African-American players of American football
20th-century African-American sportspeople
21st-century African-American sportspeople